Robert Croke may refer to:

Robert Croke (fl. 1419-1420), MP for Taunton
Robert Croke (died 1680) (1609–1680), English MP for Wendover
Robert Croke (died 1671) (1636–1671), his son, English MP for Wendover